Nove Peak is the ice-covered peak rising to 1157 m in the south part of Marescot Ridge on Trinity Peninsula in Graham Land, Antarctica.  It is surmounting the head of Malorad Glacier to the southwest.

The peak is named after the ancient Roman town of Nove in Northern Bulgaria.

Location
German-British mapping in 1996.

Maps
 Trinity Peninsula. Scale 1:250000 topographic map No. 5697. Institut für Angewandte Geodäsie and British Antarctic Survey, 1996.
 Antarctic Digital Database (ADD). Scale 1:250000 topographic map of Antarctica. Scientific Committee on Antarctic Research (SCAR). Since 1993, regularly updated.

Nove

References
 Nove Peak. SCAR Composite Antarctic Gazetteer
 Bulgarian Antarctic Gazetteer. Antarctic Place-names Commission. (details in Bulgarian, basic data in English)

External links
 Nove Peak. Copernix satellite image

Mountains of Trinity Peninsula
Bulgaria and the Antarctic